Bethel Springs is a town in McNairy County, Tennessee. The population was 998 at the 2020 census.

History
Bethel Springs was platted in 1860, when the railroad was extended to that point. A post office called Bethel Springs has been in operation since 1866. The community took its name from a nearby spring, which in turn was named after the Bethel Presbyterian Church.

Geography
Bethel Springs is located at  (35.237378, -88.611429). Bethel Springs was named after a Presbyterian church that was founded in the area. Beth-El in Hebrew literally means "house of God".

Demographics

As of the census of 2000, there were 763 people, 317 households, and 219 families residing in the town. The population density was 345.2 people per square mile (133.3/km�). There were 347 housing units at an average density of 157.0 per square mile (60.6/km�). The racial makeup of the town was 85.58% White, 13.50% African American, 0.13% Asian, 0.26% from other races, and 0.52% from two or more races. Hispanic or Latino of any race were 1.31% of the population.

There were 317 households, out of which 30.9% had children under the age of 18 living with them, 54.3% were married couples living together, 12.0% had a female householder with no husband present, and 30.6% were non-families. 28.7% of all households were made up of individuals, and 14.5% had someone living alone who was 65 years of age or older. The average household size was 2.41 and the average family size was 2.96.

In the town, the population was spread out, with 24.2% under the age of 18, 10.6% from 18 to 24, 22.9% from 25 to 44, 26.2% from 45 to 64, and 16.0% who were 65 years of age or older. The median age was 39 years. For every 100 females, there were 86.6 males. For every 100 females age 18 and over, there were 84.7 males.

The median income for a household in the town was $27,500, and the median income for a family was $33,750. Males had a median income of $26,500 versus $19,792 for females. The per capita income for the town was $14,402. About 12.8% of families and 14.7% of the population were below the poverty line, including 21.1% of those under age 18 and 11.4% of those age 65 or over.

Notable people
Albert Brewer, 47th governor of Alabama

References

External links
Town charter

Towns in McNairy County, Tennessee
Towns in Tennessee